South Wales West is an electoral region of the Senedd, consisting of seven constituencies. The region elects 11 members, seven directly elected constituency members and four additional members. The electoral region was first used in 1999, when the National Assembly for Wales was created.

Each constituency elects one Member of the Senedd by the first past the post electoral system, and the region as a whole elects four additional or top-up Members of the Senedd, to create a degree of proportional representation. The additional member seats are allocated from closed lists by the D'Hondt method, with constituency results being taken into account in the allocation.

County boundaries

The region covers the whole of the preserved county of West Glamorgan, part of the preserved county of Mid Glamorgan and part of the preserved county of South Glamorgan. The rest of Mid Glamorgan is divided between the South Wales Central and South Wales East electoral regions. The rest of South Glamorgan is within the South Wales Central region.

Electoral region profile
The region is predominantly urban, taking in Wales' second-largest city, Swansea, as well as working-class towns such as Neath and Port Talbot. However, there are also rural regions, such as on the Gower peninsula. A higher proportion of the local populace are Welsh speakers than in the neighbouring region, South Wales Central.

Constituencies
The seven constituencies have the names and boundaries of constituencies of the House of Commons of the Parliament of the United Kingdom (Westminster):

Assembly members and Members of the Senedd

Constituency AMs and MSs

Regional list AMs and MSs

N.B. This table is for presentation purposes only

2021 Senedd election

2021 Senedd election additional members

Regional MSs elected 2021

2016 Welsh Assembly election additional members
In the 2016 National Assembly for Wales election, the results for additional members were as follows:

Regional AMs elected 2016

2011 Welsh Assembly election additional members
In the 2011 National Assembly for Wales election, the results for additional members were as follows:

Regional AMs elected 2011

† Resigned as AM following his election to the UK House of Commons on 7 May 2015; replaced by Altaf Hussain from 19 May 2015.

2007 Welsh Assembly election additional members
In the election for additional members in the 2007 National Assembly for Wales election, the results were as follows:

2003 Welsh Assembly election additional members
In the election for additional members in the 2003 National Assembly for Wales election, the results were as follows:

1999 Welsh Assembly election additional members
In the election for additional members in the 1999 National Assembly for Wales election, the results were as follows:

Notes

References

Senedd electoral regions